The Carrière des Nerviens Regional Nature Reserve (in French Réserve naturelle régionale de la carrière des Nerviens) is a protected area in the Nord-Pas-de-Calais region of northern France. It is located in the municipalities of Bavay and Saint-Waast in the Nord department.

The reserve was created to protect fifteen plants of regional interest and three plant communities listed in the Habitats Directive. Its flora are linked to calcium present in marl. It is located in a transition zone between the oceanic and semi-continental climates and that gives increased biodiversity, with typical species of the atlantic areas and others more continental. The reserve also plays a role in a wildlife corridor.

The site consists of an old quarry of sandstone dated to the Famennian stage in the Late Devonian epoch. It was backfilled in the 1970s with marl. The new soil was re-colonized by pioneer species, which coexist alongside an established afforestation, forming a mosaic of habitats.

CPIE Bocage de l'Avesnois, a non-governmental organization, is the owner and operator of the reserve. The main objective is to maintain the current diversity. To this end, regular management mainly struggles against the afforestation and against invasive species, such as Japanese knot weed. The secondary objectives are environmental education, heritage interpretation, improvement of knowledge fauna and flora, and environmental monitoring.

Geography

Location

The Carrière des Nerviens Regional Nature Reserve is located in the Arrondissement of Avesnes-sur-Helpe between the cities of Valenciennes and Maubeuge, in the Nord department, Nord-Pas-de-Calais region.

The reserve is triangular in shape. CPIE Bocage de l'Avesnois owns a parcel of land on the other side of the railtrack. Though not yet included in the reserve, it is expected to be added when the current agreement is renewed.

Relief
After quarrying operations ceased, the quarry was filled mainly with the marl of the Bellignies quarry. The area has since been completely recolonized by vegetation through ecological succession.

Hydrology
The reserve is not in direct contact with the river. It is supplied with water only by precipitation, which is retained by the natural properties of marl.

Climate
The reserve's nearest weather station is at Cambrai, about 42 kilometres away, inland, to the southeast. However, the nature reserve is affected by the nearby presence of the Ardennes Mountains, which gives a continental influence to the climate.

The regular precipitation and the absence of drought, as well as the predominance of south-southwest winds and rain vectors, show the influence of oceanic climate. However, some significant rainfall variability between seasons, the moderate temperature range, and the high proportion (69.8 percent) of low winds (less than ) compared to strong winds (3.2 percent over ) winds are typical of a continental influence. This combination is atypical of an altered oceanic climate, a transition zone between the oceanic and semi-continental climates, characterized by mild winters and cool summers.

In the reserve, this climatic transition leads to increased biodiversity. For example, common bluebell (Hyacinthoides non-scripta) is a typical species of the Atlantic areas, while the common butterbur (Petasites hybridus) is more continental.

History

Quarry
The site is a former quarry, used for its sandstone deposits as early as the late nineteenth century. by the Chevallier & Cie company, which employed about 70 workers, including 25 miners.

Boreholes were drilled manually. Stone blocks were divided using a mass and a steel heavy hammer (up to ) called . Stones obtained were then classified by eye into stone for cobble and rubble for macadam. They were then sorted by size. The rubble was crushed in a jaw crusher. Debris were mechanically separated according to their size. Each particle has a particular use. Ballast is a gravel  used for concrete.

Quarrying ceased in the early 1960s (1962–1965), when the stones extracted were no longer of sufficient quality. Between 1971 and 1978, the quarry was gradually filled with marl from the Bellignies quarry. Since then, the site has been completely recolonized by vegetation through ecological succession, forming tree, shrub and herb layers.

Reserve

In 2001, the site was brought to the attention of the CPIE Bocage de l'Avesnois, pointing out the biodiversity of the new plant life. The association performed the first inventories. In the meantime, she contacted the five owners to consider a land management proposal. The commune of Bavay, the Bellignies quarry (SECAB) and a third owner sold her the property in 2003. The CPIE Bocage de l'Avesnois became the owner / operator of 85 percent of the site. The association implemented the first environmental resources management actions at the site and developed its first environmental management scheme In 2009, the association obtained the agreement establishing the regional nature reserve at the site for a period of 20 years.

The name of the reserve recalls the former industrial activity (Carrière: quarry) and the Gallo-Roman history of Bavay, the capital city of the ancient Nervii tribe.

In 2015, another owner give the management of his parcel.

Geology
The Paleozoic folded outcrops of the Bavay-Saint-Waast area are the bedrock of the eastern flank of the Mélantois' anticline, where the transgressive Cretaceous (Turonian and Cenomanian chalk) thins, and may eventually disappear by erosion. Strata of Hercynian basement, raised in the East by an important structural horst-type accident, then appear locally. In these Paleozoic strata, the Devonian presents as a sandstone base of the Lower Famennian, where the levels were quarried

Formations

Quarried level
The stone that was quarried is arkose of the Famennian stage. Approximately 360 million years ago, the thrust of forming Gondwana plates raised the seabed. Meanwhile, an ice age occurred in regions near the poles. Marine regression allowed sedimentation of detrital sand and clays which left large shoals of hard sandstone with ripple marks, alternating with levels more or less shaley according to their clay's content.

At the base of the deposit, these sandstones are reddish brown, very micaceous and shaley, sometimes containing calcareous nodules, ferruginous concretions and vegetable wax; above, they are gray and quartziferous. This is the Aye formation, including spiriferida like Cyrtospirifer verneuili, Rhynchonellida as Rhynchonella pugnus and R. boloniensis, some Orthoceras, Orthis striatula or Atrypa reticularis Well-preserved feldspar and mica probably come from wind erosion under a semi-arid climate of mountains present in the Netherlands today and extending to Düsseldorf.

Lower level

Under the Famennian, the Frasnian consists, from top to bottom, of nodular gray shale, and mica rich in fossils such as Cyrtospirifer verneuili, Spirigera concentrica, Atrypa reticularis, Orthis striatula, Productus subaculeatus, and Acervularia pentagona. Below this are gray limestone-built beds, rich in corals such as Phacellophyllum caespitosum, Thamnopora boloniensis, alternating with black shale and nodular limestone containing Cyrtospirifer verneuilli and Phacellophyllum caespitosum. These beds issue from siltation of the biostromes present in the Frasnian epoch, 370 million years ago.

Upper levels
Those Famennian strata represent the top of the Paleozoic series pleated with north dipping. Above, the transgressive Upper Cretaceous overlies horizontally with unconformity. It includes from the bottom to the top a paleozoic boulder conglomerate mixed with a sandy and glauconitic marl matrix, coarse clayey and glauconitic sands, containing Chlamys asper, Ostrea diluviana, Praeactinocamax plenus and finally marl with Terebratulina gracilis. These strata belong to the Cenomanian-Turonian and were deposited between 90 and 100 million years ago, during a transgressive phase.

Fifty million years ago, during the Ypresian age, locally called Landenian, forms of marl of the Porquerie are found. It comes from the alteration of Cretaceous rocks and takes the form of a brown or greenish plastic clay without fossils.

This stratum is covered with silt composed of clay, sand and flints and Roman pottery pieces, of the late Neogene age. Its origin can be attributed to the alteration of the underlying rocks and wind erosion.

Nature of the embankments

The stones used to backfill the quarry are those which underlie the Givetian limestone extracted in the Bellignies quarry. There is clay and very glauconitic marl of the Upper Cenomanian stage, enriched by a pebble conglomerate paléozoïc stones. These rocks contain Praeactinocamax plenus, Chlamys asper, Ostrea diluviana and radiated fossils: Janira quadricostata, Cyprina ligeriensis, Arca mailleana. There is also bluish marl of the Turonian.

Ecology

Plant communities

The site is characterized by a mosaic of 17 plant communities regrouped into three main types of ecological units: grassy open areas, shrubby areas and wooded areas. Of these, three are listed in the Habitats Directive. The calcareous rocky slopes with chasmophytic vegetation Cystopterido fragilis-Asplenietum scolopendrii are considered as exceptional, with a degree of uncertainty in the Nord-Pas-de-Calais region. Hydrophilous tall herb fringe community with Petasites hybridus, at the limit of its range, is also exceptional. The herbaceous fringe with red campion (Silene dioica) et wood forget-me-not (Myosotis sylvatica) (Sileno dioicae - Myosotidetum sylvaticae) is very rare in the Nord-Pas-de-Calais. The wood-fringe Lathyro sylvestris – Astragaletum glycyphylli is also regionally interesting.

Flora

Vascular plants
The reserve has 171 plant species, and 15 of them have heritage interest.

Twelve of them were inventoried in 2003, and their populations have been managed since. The light undergrowth contains common spotted orchid (Dactylorhiza fuchsii) and round-leaved wintergreen (Pyrola rotundifolia). Liquorice milkvetch (Astragalus glycyphyllos) and narrow-leaved everlasting-pea (Lathyrus sylvestris) are present in the small herb glade. The population of lesser butterfly-orchid (Platanthera bifolia) is located in the pioneer wood. In the glade with Calamagrostide and at the boundary of a pioneer grove grow pyramidal orchid (Anacamptis pyramidalis). bee orchid (Ophrys apifera) and man orchid (Orchis anthropophora) grow everywhere, except in the older glade. In the different herbaceous fringes grow wood forget-me-not (Myosotis sylvatica) and zigzag clover (Trifolium medium). A tall herb fringe hosts common butterbur (Petasites hybridus).

Seven plants are protected by a regional scale: common spotted orchid, man orchid, bee orchid, zigzag clover, liquorice milkvetch, narrow-leaved everlasting-pea and wood forget-me-not.

Mosses
In 2012, 43 species of bryophytes were inventoried, including Stellar calcareous moss (Mnium stellare), taxon considered as endangered on the Nord-Pas-de-Calais red regional list of bryophytes.

Mushrooms
Among the 115 species recorded in 2004 on the site, 15 are included in the red list of the Nord-Pas-de-Calais region. In the shrubs near the path where green waste was deposited by people from outside the organization grow yellow club fungus (Clavulinopsis helvola), gray shag (Coprinopsis cinerea), black earth tongues (Trichoglossum hirsutum), Arrhenia spathulata and Marasmius limosus. Those two last species are also in the Calamagrostide's glade of a pioneer wood of willow and birch, with moor club (Clavaria argillacea), Geoglossum cookeanum, lilac leg fibrecap (Inocybe griseolilacina), (Stropharia pseudocyanea), girdled knight (Tricholoma cingulatum) and burnt knight (Tricholoma ustale). Near orchid stations in the pioneer wood exist golden spindles (Clavulinopsis fusiformis), Hebeloma clavulipes, Hebeloma fusipes, Hebeloma pusillum, and also lilac leg fibrecap and burnt knight. Dog stinkhorn (Mutinus caninus) and Scytinostroma hemidichophyticum for their part, were observed in the shaded path north of the site on the edge of mature wood.

Fauna

Mammals
Common mammals found here include the red fox, red squirrel, hare and rabbit, mole, wood mouse, bank vole and field vole. Two species of bats frequent the site regularly to hunt: the Daubenton's bat (Myotis daubentonii) and common pipistrelle (Pipistrellus pipistrellus). They cannot, however, establish their habitat due to the lack of roosting sites in the reserve's young trees.

Birds
Forty-two species of birds have been observed on the site, 25 of which are breeding there. Twenty-two species are protected nationally; five are listed on the annex OO of the Bonn Convention, which aims to conserve migratory species throughout their range. However, no species can be considered as heritage. The northern goshawk and Eurasian sparrowhawk benefit from the abundance of sparrows feeding. The common grasshopper warbler stops there during its migration and the common nightingale nests there occasionally.

Reptiles and amphibians
The common toad (Bufo bufo) and the common frog (Rana temporaria) are the only amphibians on the site. They use it in winter or during their migration. The viviparous lizard (Zootoca vivipara) likes the slate deposits and ballast of the track. It hunts in the herbaceous areas, very flowery in summer and high in insects. The common wall lizard (Podarcis muralis) has been seen in 2013. The slowworm reproduction (Anguis fragilis) is attested by the observation of young under rocks and other debris.

Invertebrates
Reproduction of Odonata is not possible on the site because of the lack of standing water. However, thanks to the richness of insects in the herbaceous areas, several species can be encountered including the western clubtail ( Gomphus pulchellus), a species present in the Regional Red List of dragonflies North Pas-de-Calais.

Twenty-three species of butterflies and 105 species of moth enjoy the floral diversity of the site. The holly blue (Celastrina argiolus) is a heritage species.

Of the nine species of Orthoptera identified, two are considered heritage: the sickle-bearing bush cricket (Phaneroptera falcata), rare in the region, enjoys the dry and high herbaceous areas and the long-horned groundhopper (Tetrix tenuicornis) is a pioneer species of poor vegetation settings.

The wildlife corridor
To the north are present two sites containing a rich biodiversity: the Natura 2000 Belgian area "" and a ZNIEFF "". The Bellignies quarry with embankments similar to those which filled "" is therefore under similar ecological conditions. In the south, the Forêt de Mormal is a major area for biodiversity covered by ZNIEFF and Natura 2000 sites. The railway, unused recently and the stream  then the river  provide connection.

Threats and responses
In the past, the site was threatened by garbage dumps or by passage of 4x4 vehicles or quads. The installation of gates by the municipality of Bavay solved the problem. Pedestrians rarely venture off the path. The anthropization is limited. The greatest threats to the species are primary succession and invasive plants.

Primary succession
The marls was colonized by pioneer species, then shrubs and trees, corresponding to a primary succession. Without human intervention, a climax community would be reached. This dynamic may eventually lead to the disappearance of related open environments, particularly heritage species. However woodlands can also play an important role in creating habitat for many species. The management plan is therefore to maintain patch dynamics.

Invasive species
Four invasive species are a problem in the reserve.

Wood small-reed (Calamagrostis epigejos) is present in the center of the site and threatens to spread into herbaceous areas. It compromises sustainability of stations, including man orchid and bee orchid populations. Two distinct zones can be distinguished. The first, where the wood small-reed has a very high rate of recovery, is not hosting any heritage value. It is mowed early and disposed of. Grazing is not possible at the moment. The second, on the contrary, not densely colonized by this plant is much more of a fragile situation due to the presence of orchids and the sickle-bearing bush cricket or long-horned groundhopper. Differentiated management is applied depending on the issues. At orchid stations, slight thinning is done early by hand pruning. The less dense areas where the grass is sparse (conducive to the long-horned groundhopper (Tetrix tenuicornis)) are pulled. In the newly opened areas, a systematic and annual pulling avoids expansion. Finally, dense areas, well exposed, are left in that state.

Many extensive areas of Japanese knotweed (Fallopia japonica) are on the site. Heritage stations of common butterbur and hart's-tongue fern, colonized by invasive species, are managed by manual removal and disposal for incineration.

The bramble (Rubus sp.) lie around the ruins and along the south-east of the site near the houses. Due to an interest in preserving wildlife (e.g. refuge for mammals, insects, nesting wrens), they are not eradicated but contained.

Canada golden-rod (Solidago canadensis) appeared in 2003 as a result of plant deposits. The threat proved to be serious the following year. Some stations show a significant concentration of the species, while isolated plants grow everywhere on the site. This plant is easily pulled by hand before flowering to prevent seed dispersal, and the shoots are burned.

Finally, panicled aster (Symphyotrichum lanceolatum) is also present among the invasive plants. In their native countries, American asters are found in wet places. In France, these plants colonize relatively dry ruderal areas (brownfields, road shoulder ...) or wetlands. In this second case, asters show strong invasive behavior. In the reserve, where the majority of areas are dry, this plant does not present special hazards and removal is managed easily.

Management

Protection
The entire site is included in a ZNIEFF type 1  and another of type 2 .

Management objectives

The second version of the environmental management scheme covers the period 2007–2012. It presents the knowledge, management, monitoring and vulgarization objectives.

The preservation of the existing diversity was the most important goal. It required conservation of the heritage plant communities: tall-herb fen with common butterbur, the chasmophytic vegetation with hart's-tongue fern and the woody fringe Lathyro sylvestris – Astragaletum glycyphylli. The survival of populations of round-leaved wintergreen and of man orchid, the two most interesting plants, was also a priority, as a strikeout against brush invasion in the open areas where bee orchid and pyramidal orchid grow. The natural forest dynamics are to be contained within areas of clear undergrowth or fringes with these species: common spotted orchid, zigzag clover and lesser butterfly-orchid. Pioneer areas with mushrooms should be preserved and the invasive species contained. Artificial infrastructures (ruin, concrete pylons, walls and rock piles) should be utilized for the creation of new habitats.

The education, interpretation and promotion of local heritage missions should also be continued, while the fauna knowledge was to be developed and floristic monitoring provided.

Assessment of the activities
Evaluation is in progress. However, a partial analysis is already underway.

Activities carried out
The Bavay's municipality has erected two barriers to prohibit access to motorized vehicles. Volunteers and employees of the CPIE Bocage de l'Avesnois manage the site regularly.

Management of the diversity
Manual removal of the Japanese knotweed has preserved heritage stations of common butterbur and hart's-tongue fern. Early hand pruning was conducive to orchids. The late mowing seems rather ineffective. The grubbing-up of the Canada golden-rod and American asters was successful. The bush clearing and selective logging have helped maintain the wood-fringe with narrow-leaved everlasting-pea and liquorice milkvetch. Common spotted orchid, zigzag clover and lesser butterfly-orchid, species non-adapted to open areas, benefited areas without clearing. The low dry-stone walls probably favored the installation of viviparous lizard or common wall lizard, observed in 2013, but also the consolidation of the hart's-tongue fern population.

From 2007 to 2012, the number of round-leaved wintergreen footage increased by 50 percent. On the other hand, those of man orchid fall suddenly and continually. Whereas 27 plants were counted in 2003, the number reached a peak of 240 in 2006 with the uprooting of the wood small-reed, before collapsing to 13 plants in 2012, despite the continued management. The observation of gnawed seedlings can assume leaf consumption by herbivores. Protection against rodents was established in 2013 and will be evaluated at flowering.

On this site, 171 plant species are surveyed. Given its size and poor soil, this diversity is notable. Management undertaken in recent years has been essential to maintaining open areas, the most threatened by primary succession. Thus, the various vegetation layers (pioneer and mature woodland, bushy areas, open areas) provide a mosaic of habitats, and thus remarkable species.

Improved knowledge of flora and fauna
Besides heritage plants monitoring, an additional inventory of Orthoptera is being undertaken; three new species were identified in 2013: common pheasant, Eurasian siskin and common wall lizard. Fourteen new plants were also identified. Inventories of bats and mushrooms are being carried out by partners.

Education, interpretation and promotion of local heritage

Guided outing and participatory management sessions are regularly held with the public or agricultural colleges, including invasive species managing. The heritage interpretation site has yet to be finalized.

New opportunities
Interreg micro projects, established in February 2012, resulted in methodological exchanges on the management of reserves between two Belgian associations  and Natagora.

A new environmental management scheme is now under consideration.

Bibliography

Studies of the reserve
The following documents are available from the operator: CPIE Bocage de l'Avesnois.

History of quarry and geology

Ecology and management

Other references

Notes and references

Notes

References

Nature reserves in France
Protected areas established in 2009
Geography of Nord (French department)
Tourist attractions in Nord (French department)